Doris Francis (born 6 October 1969) is a Dominican former cricketer who played primarily as a right-arm medium bowler. She appeared in one Test match and 17 One Day Internationals for the West Indies between in 2003 and 2004. She also played for the United States between 2009 and 2011. She played domestic cricket for Dominica and Saint Lucia.

Francis only took up cricket at the age of 25. Francis made her international debut in March 2003, in a One Day International (ODI) series against Sri Lanka. Later in the year, she also featured in the 2003 IWCC Trophy, where the West Indies finished runner-up to Ireland to qualify for the 2005 World Cup. In 2004, Francis represented the West Indies in ODI series against India and Pakistan, also playing a single Test match against the latter team. In the second innings of the Test, she made 46* from ninth in the batting order, putting on 105 runs for the eighth wicket with Jacqueline Robinson.

Overall, Francis played 17 ODIs for the West Indies, taking 13 wickets. She continued playing cricket after moving to the United States, and made her debut for the US national team at the 2009 Americas Championship. She was one of three former West Indies internationals in the side, the others being Candacy Atkins and Roselyn Emmanuel. In the first match of the tournament, against Brazil, Francis took 2/9 and scored 10*, for which she was named player of the match. She returned for the tournament's 2010 edition, taking 3/16 in one game against Canada. Francis made her final international appearances at the 2011 World Cup Qualifier, where she was appointed team captain. Aged 42, she took two wickets from six matches (against South Africa and Zimbabwe), and made 68 runs, with a highest of 23 against Bangladesh.

References

External links
 
 

1969 births
Living people
American women cricketers
Dominica emigrants to the United States
Dominica women cricketers
West Indies women One Day International cricketers
West Indies women Test cricketers
West Indian women cricketers
21st-century American women